Ruth Wasserman Lande (born February 28, 1976) is an Israeli politician, diplomat and activist. She was a member of the Knesset for the Blue and White party from 2021 until 2022 and also was an MK for the party in two short spells in early 2021.

She is also the founder and CEO of a strategic consultancy, working with public entities within the Israeli and international arenas, a public speaker, a diplomat, lecturer, column writer in Maariv,  and social activist particularly amidst the Arab population in Israel. She is also a Middle East affairs' commentator for various media outlets around the world. Wasserman Lande served as an advisor for late President Shimon Peres, as the de facto Deputy Ambassador at the Israeli embassy in Cairo and for almost a decade as the Deputy Director General for International Affairs at the Israeli Federation of Local Authorities.

Biography

Family, military service, and studies

Ruth Lande was born in Israel to Pinchas and Sofia Lande, who made aliyah from Lithuania. When she was nine, her family moved to Cape Town, South Africa, where she attended Herzlia High School. Her family then moved to Los Angeles when she was 17, while she returned to Israel alone

Wasserman Lande was drafted into the Israel Defense Forces and completed her army service, attaining captain's rank in the IDF Intelligence Corps, where she continues to serve as a reservist. After her army service, Wasserman Lande earned a B.A. in Political Science and Communications from Bar Ilan University, graduating Cum Laude, followed by an M.A. in International Relations and Diplomacy from the Hebrew University of Jerusalem, graduating Magna Cum Laude. She was also awarded the Simcha Pratt Award for excellence for her Thesis, analyzing the negotiations between Israel and the Palestinians within the framework of the Oslo Accords .

Career
In 2001, in parallel with her university studies in Israel, Wasserman Lande was chosen to participate in the prestigious Foreign Ministry training program, after which she was appointed to head the Ministry of Foreign Affairs’ UK and Ireland desk. In January 2003, she was appointed to a diplomatic post at the Israeli embassy in Egypt. There she focused on promoting Israeli-Egyptian political and economic relations, including creating the platform for the QIZ – The qualified industrial zone trade agreement between Israel-Egypt and the USA. In 2006, her final year at the embassy, Wasserman Lande, was the de facto deputy chief of mission to Ambassador Shalom Cohen.

Following her diplomatic service in Cairo, Wasserman Lande began studying for a second M.A. in policy and government at Harvard University's Kennedy School of Government. That is, within the framework of the Wexner Scholarship. While at Harvard, she founded The Israel Caucus, an organization dedicated to showcasing the Israeli society's diverse facets, which still successfully functions today. In 2007, Wasserman Lande was seconded from the Ministry of Foreign Affairs to work for two years as an adviser to former Israeli President Shimon Peres. She served as the liaison between the Office of the President and the Ministry of Foreign Affairs and forwarded Israel-Jewish Diaspora affairs and foreign policy in general.

Public activities 
In 2010, she completed the preparatory studies for a Ph.D in international relations at Oxford University's St. Anthony's College, returning to Israel to continue her research. Wasserman Lande lived for a decade in the Israeli Jewish-Arab city of Lod, where she and her husband, Aviv, were the founders of the Lod Community Foundation, which was founded in 2008.  Volunteering with the foundation, she was instrumental in developing tourism, culture, education, and employment in the city.

Upon returning to Israel, Wasserman Lande was appointed as the Deputy Director-General of the Federation of Local Authorities in Israel. She reached out to the international arena to identify foreign investors, empowerment opportunities, partners for cooperation, and people-to-people initiatives for local governments throughout Israel. Within this framework, she worked closely with cities in the periphery and the country's center, both Arab and Jewish, religious and secular, large and small. Here, she also set out-voluntarily- to create a model of emulation out of a Bedouin village in the North of the country, Shibli–Umm al-Ghanam, recruiting partners from the public and the private sectors-government ministries, philanthropists, the diplomatic core serving in Israel, businesspeople, both Jewish and Arab, the local leadership in the Bedouin village and the local community. All this was done with a group of volunteers, senior personalities from within the public service in Israel, which she recruited and led – during four years - towards the creation of game-changing initiatives and engines of growth within this municipality.

Wasserman Lande continues to closely follow and accompany the diverse Arab communities throughout Israel and the Middle East.

Since her return from Egypt and until now, she often lectures at many prestigious universities worldwide. She has addressed the British parliament, senior delegations of US members of congress and other dignitaries visiting Israel, as well as Israeli diplomatic, educational, and economic circles.

Since 2019, she has been writing a column in one of Israel's leading newspapers, Maariv, dealing with different angles of the Israeli Arab realm and the Middle East. She also often writes for the Jerusalem Report and the Jerusalem Post.

She is also a commentator on Egyptian and Middle Eastern affairs on foreign and Israeli television stations, including National Public Radio (NPR), the BBC, Israel's Channel 1, Channel 2, Hala TV,  Bukra and Israel Plus. She is fluent in Hebrew, English, Russian, and Arabic.

She became an MK in early January 2021 as a replacement for Meirav Cohen, though she was forced from her seat when Yizhar Shai resigned his ministerial position and regained his previous Knesset seat. She regained a Knesset seat when Ram Shefa resigned. Placed tenth on the Blue and White list for the March 2021 elections, she lost her seat again as Blue and White was reduced to eight seats. She is an MK in the 24th Knesset as a result of the Norwegian Law.

References

External links 

1976 births
Living people
Israeli Jews
Israeli management consultants
Israeli soldiers
Harvard Kennedy School alumni
Secular Jews
Bar-Ilan University alumni
Israeli people of Lithuanian-Jewish descent
Hebrew University of Jerusalem Faculty of Social Sciences alumni
Alumni of Herzlia High School
Israel Resilience Party politicians
Blue and White (political alliance) politicians
Members of the 23rd Knesset (2020–2021)
Members of the 24th Knesset (2021–2022)
Women members of the Knesset